Leucopogon corymbiformis is a species of flowering plant in the heath family Ericaceae and is endemic to the south-west of Western Australia. It is an erect shrub with glabrous branchlets, narrowly elliptic to egg-shaped leaves with the narrower end towards the base, and white, bell-shaped flowers arranged in leaf axils and at the ends of branches.

Description

Taxonomy and naming
Leucopogon corymbiformis was first formally described in 2014 by Michael Clyde Hislop in the journal Nuytsia from specimens he collected in Cape Arid National Park in 2012. The specific epithet (corymbiformis) means "corymb-shaped".

Distribution and habitat

Conservation status
Leucopogon corymbiformis is classified as "Priority Two" by the Western Australian Government Department of Biodiversity, Conservation and Attractions, meaning that it is poorly known and from only one or a few locations.

References

corymbiformis
Ericales of Australia
Flora of Western Australia
Plants described in 2014